Christine Otterbach is a German wheelchair tennis player. She represented Germany at the 2000 Summer Paralympics held in Sydney, Australia and she won the  bronze medal in the women's doubles event together with Petra Sax-Scharl. She also competed in the women's singles event where she was eliminated in the first match.

References

External links 
 

Living people
Year of birth missing (living people)
Place of birth missing (living people)
Paralympic wheelchair tennis players of Germany
Wheelchair tennis players at the 2000 Summer Paralympics
Medalists at the 2000 Summer Paralympics
Paralympic bronze medalists for Germany
German female tennis players
Paralympic medalists in wheelchair tennis